First Street or 1st Street may refer to:

 First Street (Hong Kong)
 1st Street (Los Angeles)
 Anyang 1st Street
 First Street station (disambiguation), train stations of the name
 First Street, a store brand operated by the Smart & Final grocery chain
 First Street, Singapore, a road in Siglap
 Mercer Street (Manhattan), formerly called by that name

See also
 
 
 First Avenue (disambiguation)
 List of highways numbered 1
 First (disambiguation)
 Street (disambiguation)